The Caspian shrew (Crocidura caspica) is a species of mammal in the family Soricidae. It is found along the southern coast of the Caspian Sea in Iran and Azerbaijan.

References

Mammals of Azerbaijan
Mammals of the Middle East
Mammals described in 1907
Taxa named by Oldfield Thomas